Shalini Chandran is an Indian actress known for her role of Maithili in Kahaani Ghar Ghar Kii. She also appeared as Tanya in Hamari Betiyoon Ka Vivaah and has performed on Kabhi Kabhii Pyaar Kabhi Kabhii Yaar.

Filmography

Films 
 Badmaash Company as Anu (Shahid Kapoor's sister)
 Desire (Short film)
 Love 
 Shaandaar

Television 
 Kahaani Ghar Ghar Kii as Maithili
 Kabhi Kabhii Pyaar Kabhi Kabhii Yaar as herself
 Hamari Betiyoon Ka Vivaah as Tanya
 Crime Patrol (TV series) as recurring characters 
 Rishton Se Badi Pratha as Surbhi (replaced by Parul Chauhan)
 Vivah as Palak
 Savdhaan India

External links
 
 

Indian television actresses
Living people
Year of birth missing (living people)
Actresses in Hindi television
21st-century Indian actresses